Derrick Mokaleng (born 18 June 1997) is a South African sprinter specialising in the 400 metres. He represented his country at the 2019 World Championships narrowly missing the semifinals.

In 2019, he won the silver medal in the men's 4 × 400 metres relay at the 2019 African Games held in Rabat, Morocco.

International competitions

Personal bests
Outdoor
200 metres – 20.86 (+0.6 m/s, Fort Worth 2018)
400 metres – 45.02 (Waco 2018)

Indoor
400 metres – 45.67 (Lubbock 2019) NR

References

1997 births
Living people
South African male sprinters
Athletes (track and field) at the 2019 African Games
African Games silver medalists for South Africa
World Athletics Championships athletes for South Africa
TCU Horned Frogs men's track and field athletes
South African expatriates in the United States
African Games medalists in athletics (track and field)
20th-century South African people
21st-century South African people